Borzaljin (also Romanized as Barzaljīn, Borzelajīn, Borzolajīn, Būraz Lājīn, Būrzolājīn, and Būrzūlājīn) is a village in Afshariyeh Rural District, Khorramdasht District, Takestan County, Qazvin Province, Iran. Village crops: grapes, walnuts, almonds, wheat, landmarks of the village: Imam Zadeh Seyyedeh Sakineh Khanum Javadi is a member of the Imam Jawad (AS), Dul-Dole-Band, Ancient Hill, House of Chalet, and Forest in the village of Korcheshmeh. At the 2017 census, its population was 924, in 297 families.

References 

Populated places in Takestan County